The Roosevelt Story is a 1947 American documentary film written and directed by Lawrence M. Klee. The film is a documentary about the private and public life of Franklin D. Roosevelt. The film was narrated by Ed Begley, Gene Blakely, Kelly Flint, Canada Lee and Kenneth Lynch. The film was released on August 30, 1947, by United Artists.

Synopsis

Cast
Ed Begley as Narrator
Gene Blakely as Narrator
Kelly Flint as Narrator
Canada Lee	as Narrator
Kenneth Lynch as Narrator

See also
 The Roosevelts (2014 documentary miniseries)

References

External links 
 

1947 films
Black-and-white documentary films
1947 documentary films
United Artists films
Films about Franklin D. Roosevelt
Cultural depictions of Franklin D. Roosevelt
Documentary films about presidents of the United States
American black-and-white films
Films scored by Earl Robinson
American documentary films
1940s English-language films
1940s American films